Hans Coumans (19 March 1943 – 16 November 1986) was a Dutch painter active in the South Limburg region, Belgium and Germany. He was self-taught and produced approximately 1700 works. He painted in the Impressionist painting style.

Biography
Coumans was born and grew up in Schin op Geul. Between the ages of 15 and 19 he undertook several long journeys through Germany, Austria, Belgium, France and Spain. In 1961 he joined the touring circus company Toni Boltini for six months, in which he worked as an elephant handler.

Coumans briefly studied at the Maastricht Institute of Arts and briefly studied with visual artist Charles Eyck. He started out as a landscape painter and portraitist, but he earned his living mainly with decorative art, often with the Heuvelland as subject, in dozens of catering companies in Valkenburg aan de Geul and the surrounding area. He also made (charcoal) quick portraits in bars, at fairs and at all kinds of events. In 1965 he moved for a short time to Haarlem and Amsterdam, where he joined the Provo movement. After a few months he returned to Limburg. In 1969 he went to Spain, where he produced wall scenes in Benidorm, Lloret de Mar and Calella de la Costa. He returned to Valkenburg because of problems with payments. There he married Christine van Kempen in 1970. From that moment on, he mainly made paintings of the Limburg hills. In 1976 he moved to Nuth and in 1981 to Bingelrade.

Coumans died in 1986 as a result of a car accident.

Painting style
Coumans' style can be classified under Post-Impressionism. His contemporaries worked on abstract and conceptual art, but Coumans painted outside the mainstream and was mainly inspired by nature. His oeuvre includes landscapes, village scenes (cultural heritage), still lifes, quickly painted portraits and socially critical works.

Works

References

1943 births
1986 deaths
Dutch male painters
People from Schin op Geul